Toxocara malayasiensis is a species of feline roundworm, a parasite which infects the intestine of cats. Feline roundworms are passed in the fecal matter of cats, and can be transmitted to humans, causing toxocariasis, a potentially serious disease.

See also 
 List of parasites (human)
 Susceptibility and severity of infections in pregnancy
 Feline zoonosis

References

External links 
 Roundworms: Cats and Kittens from The Pet Health Library
 CDC podcast on Toxocariasis

Parasites of cats
Ascaridida
Veterinary helminthology
Zoonoses
Health issues in pregnancy
Parasitic infestations, stings, and bites of the skin
Congenital disorders
Nematodes described in 2001